The following is a list of the Pakistani people sorted by order of their declared or estimated wealth in U.S. dollars.

Pakistanis by net worth

References

External links 
 

Lists of people by wealth
 
Net worth
Economy of Pakistan-related lists